María González Veracruz (Murcia, July 11, 1979) is a Spanish politician.

Biography 
Born in Murcia. She has a degree in biochemistry from the University of Murcia, with part of research experience in Molecular Genetics developed in Leipzig (Germany)..
María González Tovar soon began its activity in politics as part of the Young Socialists (was Secretary General of the same from 2003 to 2009) in their political beginnings. José Luis Rodríguez Zapatero, in the Socialist Congress of 2008, appointed María González Veracruz secretary in the PSOE Federal Executive.

Since 2003 a member of the Regional Executive Committee of the PSOE in the Region of Murcia and a member of the Federal Committee of the PSOE since 2004.

Political career 

 Member of the X legislature. Deputy in Parliament of Spain by the Socialist Group in the Region of Murcia.
 Regional Deputy Regional Assembly of Murcia (2007-2011): responsible for the areas of Housing spokesman Youth, and, currently, Research, Innovation and New Technologies.
 Ministry of Innovation and New Technology of the Federal Executive Committee of the PSOE. (2008-2012). Through this secretariat has made to the Law on Science and Innovation, the status of Young Innovative Company and the State Innovation Strategy, the Sustainable Economy Act, among other innovative projects promoted by the Government of Spain.
 Member of the Joint Commission for Relations with the Court of Auditors from 08/02/2012 to 23/02/2012
 Member of the Committee on Industry, Energy and Tourism from 17/01/2012 to 21/02/2012
 Spokesman of the Commission of Economy and Competitiveness from 18/01/2012 to 01/03/2012

- Others

 Researcher 2002-2006 (University of Murcia and Institute of Biochemistry, Leipzig, Germany).

Notes and references

External links 
 María Gónzalez Veracruz. Details on the official website of the PSOE.

1979 births
Living people
Members of the 12th Congress of Deputies (Spain)
Members of the Regional Assembly of Murcia
People from Murcia
United Left (Spain) politicians
Women members of the Congress of Deputies (Spain)